Uncle Monk was an American bluegrass band. The band's two members were Tommy Ramone, an original member of the Ramones, and Claudia Tienan, a guitarist, bassist and vocalist formerly with an alternative band, the Simplistics.

Uncle Monk released one album, also named Uncle Monk (March 2006). Tommy Ramone wrote to Jari-Pekka Laitio-Ramone in 2012–2014, that Uncle Monk are working with their second album. Tommy wrote: "Yes, Claudia and I are finishing up the next record. There will be indie songs, bluegrass songs, old-time songs, romantic songs, and unclassifiable songs", Tommy explained to Jari-Pekka who run Ramones' page http://www.ramonesheaven.com.

Ramone died at his home in Queens, New York City, on July 11, 2014, aged 65.

References 

 Review of the album

External links 
Uncle Monk Official site
Uncle Monk on Myspace

2006 establishments in New York (state)
2014 disestablishments in New York (state)
American bluegrass music groups
Musical groups established in 2006
Musical groups disestablished in 2014